Jim Courier was the defending champion, but lost in the second round to Andrei Cherkasov.

John McEnroe won the title by defeating Goran Ivanišević 6–7(4–7), 4–6, 7–6(7–3), 6–3, 6–4 in the final.

Seeds

Draw

Finals

Top half

Bottom half

References

External links
 Official results archive (ATP)
 Official results archive (ITF)

Swiss Indoors - Singles